Champawat district is a district of Uttarakhand state in northern India. The town of Champawat is the administrative headquarters. The district of Champawat constituted in the year 1997. The district is divided into five tehsils: Barakot, Lohaghat, Pati, Purnagiri, and Champawat. There is 2 Sub Tehsil: Pulla and Munch. The largest and the main city of the district is Tanakpur.

Champawat district is part of the eastern Kumaon division of Uttarakhand. It is bounded on the north by Pithoragarh district, on the east by Nepal, on the south by Udham Singh Nagar district, on the west by Nainital district, and on the northwest by Almora district.

 it is the second least populous of the 13 districts of Uttarakhand, after Rudraprayag.

Economy
In 2006 the Ministry of Panchayati Raj named Champawat one of the country's 250 most backward districts (out of a total of 640 districts). It is one of the three districts in Uttarakhand currently receiving funds from the Backward Regions Grant Fund Programme (BRGF).

Assembly Constituencies
Lohaghat 
Champawat

Demographics
, Champawat district has a population of 259,648 roughly equal to the nation of Vanuatu. This gives it a ranking of 579th among the 640 districts of India. Its population growth rate over the decade 2001–2011 was 15.63%. Champawat district has a sex ratio of 980 females for every 1000 males, and a literacy rate of 79.83%. Scheduled Castes and Scheduled Tribes make up 18.25% and 0.52% of the population respectively.

 Indian census, the Champawat district had a population of 224,542, including 216,646 Hindus (96.5%), 6,642 (3.0%) Muslims, and 626 (0.3%) Christians.

The major spoken language by of the district is Kumaoni.

See also
Jhirkuni. village in Barakot Tahsil

References

External links

 
 Champawat District Map
 Kumaoni.org - Information on Kumaon Region and Community

 
Districts of Uttarakhand